Sweden women's national under-17 football team is the football team representing Sweden in competitions for under-17 year old players and is controlled by the Swedish Football Association. The team has never qualified for the FIFA U-17 Women's World Cup.

Competitive record

FIFA U-17 Women's World Cup

The team has never qualified

UEFA Women's Under-17 Championship

The team has qualified in 2013.

Current squad
The following 24 players were named to the 2022 season squad.

Head coach: Lovisa Delby

Head coaches history
Marie Bengtsson (2001–2010)
Yvonne Ekroth (2010–2015)
Katarina Olsson (2011–2017)
Ulf Kristiansson (2016–2017)
Pia Sundhage (2018–2019)
Pär Lagerström (2018–2020)
Lotta Hellenberg (2019–present)
Lovisa Delby (2021–present)
Anders Bengtsson (2022–present)

See also

 Sweden women's national football team
 Sweden women's national under-19 football team
 FIFA U-17 Women's World Cup
 UEFA Women's Under-17 Championship

References

F
Women's national under-17 association football teams